, previously known simply as Nozomi during her fashion modeling career, is a Japanese glamour model and former professional fashion model.

After working as a fashion model for nearly 7 years, she has become famous as a gravure idol and main ringside commentator / spokesperson for the mixed martial arts competition Dream Fighting Championships and the kickboxing competition K-1 World Max since 2009.

Since late 2008 she has released eight photobooks and three DVDs, and has also made countless appearances on television, magazines, and ads unrelated to fashion / cosmetic, including ones for Coca-Cola's green tea products, Suntory's 3 soft drink products, So-net, Willcom, Fujifilm, Kao, Rohto Pharmaceutical Co. and Seiko's Tisse brand line created for and dedicated to her. She has also endorsed an accessory brand, Cotton Cloud, since June 2010 when it was created for her and its first flag shop opened in Harajuku.

In 2010, she started her music career, debuting with the single "Kamu to Funyan" (噛むとフニャン) which featured rapper Astro and was used in the tie-in commercials for Lotte Fit's Chewing Gum. Sasaki's debut album Nozomi Collection was released on April 18, 2012.

In 2017, she married comedian and TV presenter Ken Watabe. They have one child.

Biography

Modeling
Sasaki began modeling at the age of around 14. She modeled mainly in the collection circuit, and for fashion / cosmetic advertisements. In the later years of her modeling career, she was a featured model and contributor to the now defunct Pinky magazine. She first appeared on the cover of Pinky in July 2007, along with another cover girl, Emi Suzuki.

One theory suggests that Suzuki was the person who brought Sasaki to the commercial modeling field after she discovered Sasaki when Sasaki was planning to retire from modeling, and it has been noted that Sasaki already appeared at the time to be significantly chubbier than she used to be.

She was the model of Japanese magazine, "PINKY", "non-no", "Oggi"; currently, she is the model of "with". (refer to the external link below)

Gravure
After further intentionally gaining weight, she began appearing as a glamour model (gravure idol) on the youth-targeted weekly manga magazine Young Jump in 2005, and in the Pinky fashion magazine in 2006. She made her first landing on the top cover of Young Jump in May 2007.

Nozomi Sasaki released her first photobook, Nozomi, in August 2008, and her first DVD, Weekly Young Jump Premium DVD: nozomi, in September 2009. She released her second DVD, Dolly, and two photobooks, Sasaki Nozomi in Tenshi no Koi and Non, in 2009.

In early 2010 she was specially featured by 2.4 million selling manga series Usogui on Young Jump, and released her fourth photobook Prism. Despite her breast size which has been known as one of the smallest in the gravure scene, she became a successful model by the end of 2010 in the field where breast size is regarded as a vital factor.

At that time she also began appearing on the Non-no magazine, a biweekly girl-next-door-orientated fashion magazine that does not usually feature people like her. Though after becoming more of a gravure idol than a professional model, Sasaki was heavily featured in a spring fashion collection presented by the magazine and BS-TBS, and soon after that, she landed on the top cover of the magazine. These appearances have been described as like an "invasion", as she has significantly changed the magazine's tone. Some critics have suggested that the magazine has been destroyed by Nozomi Sasaki.

Television, film and print
She has regularly appeared on over 10 television programs and over 20 television commercials since 2009. Her first huge hit on the TV scene was a TV commercial for Lotte's new chewing gum product Fit's, where she performed a "silly dance" called the Fit's dance. Fit's became a smash hit, selling over 40 million in its first 5 months in the Japanese gum market where 4 million-per-year is considered large success.

In March 2009, she was chosen as the image character for a special advertising campaign by the Japan Magazine Publishers Association, a governmental publishing trade association run by the Ministry of Education. During the campaign between July 21, 2009 - August 20, 2009, her portrait appeared in 300 different magazines and as 30,000 posters for bookstores and public libraries all over Japan, 100,000 posters hung in trains in the Tokyo metropolitan area and the Kansai area, and 2,009 prepaid cards.

Having made a cameo appearance in the romantic comedy Handsome Suit as well as minor roles in two television serials, Sasaki scored a major breakthrough in her budding acting career with the lead role in the 2009 sentimental romance film Tenshi no Koi, where she played a teenage girl in a fragile relationship with an older man played by Shosuke Tanihara. The film became an instant hit and was also distributed in some nearby countries such as Hong Kong, Taiwan, and Singapore.
In 2010, she acted in the television drama Dohyo Girl where she played a model who became the coach of a high school sumo team. This was the first time in her acting career that she took the lead role in a television drama series.

She also made her singing debut in July 2010 with the catch phrase "Heta de Gomenne!" ("Forgive my bad singing!") when she released a single, Kamu to Funyan feat. Astro, which debuted at number one on the Oricon singles chart. At the end of 2010 she released her second single titled Jin Jin Jingle Bell, a cover version of Chisato Moritaka's 1995 hit. She was expected to participate in the NHK Kohaku show, an annual New Year's Eve musical TV show, but when she was asked about it by the press during the commemoration event for Jin Jin Jingle Bell, she stated that she did not wish to appear on it. She stated that she could not sing and was shy, implying she would never perform her songs live in public. As a result, she did not attend the show.

K-1 and Dream
Immediately following the firing of the predecessor, Akina Minami, she was picked as the ringside commentator for K-1. Soon after this, she was also selected by Dream as the ringside commentator. Since then, she has worked for these two combat sport competitions not only as the ringside commentator but also as a spokesperson since April 2009. She immediately established a good reputation. Remy Bonjasky has referred to her as a "good one", "Oh, well I think she's good, she seems too calm, at least way better than that one I saw at the previous World GP". Gago Drago commented "You know, she's uncannily reticent compared to other ringside gals I know, but in a way it's good, you know, especially during a fight!". Buakaw Por. Pramuk commented after K-1 World MAX 2009 World Championship Tournament Final, "Immediately after the bout, that girl gave me a towel with her awesome smile. It killed all of my pain!". In Dream, many fighters, including Joachim Hansen, JZ Calvan, Zelg Galešić, Choi Hong-man, Paulo Filho, James Thompson, Bibiano Fernandes, Kultar Gill, Sergei Kharitonov and Josh Barnett, have positively made highly-extolling comments about the new face, resulting in being described as gullible cherry boys by Rin Takanashi on Twitter. Only a few criticisms have been levelled at her, notably, Badr Hari has stated that he thinks the predecessor and the heavyweight division's long-term commentator Norika Fujiwara were better because he finds her "somehow ominous".

Public reception
Since she debuted as a glamour model, she has been known for her doll-like image attributed to her looks and manners, hence her first full-scale DVD's title "Dolly".

Unlike her mentor, Emi Suzuki, who has rejected nearly all interview requests even after beginning to appear in the general celebrity scene, Sasaki has normally granted interviews since 2009 when she began appearing in the general celebrity scene. She often speaks in her native language, the Akita dialect, which people outside of the northern region hardly understand, thus, the press chasing her are often with translators. It has also been known that some reporters have been banned from interviewing her, and they are mainly those who have attempted to ask her questions about her past, specifically, her fashion modeling years.
The topic of her fashion modeling years has occasionally become a matter of public interest, although she has never spoken about it. In April 2010 a photographer mentioned Sasaki in an interview, saying he witnessed Sasaki's first meeting with Yukina Kinoshita, a commercial model who has been known as a notorious brawler, a claimed former member of a bosozoku gang, and has become Sasaki's co-worker. The photographer apparently, in 2008, witnessed their pre-brawling scene where Kinoshita picked a fight with Sasaki, pouncing on Sasaki, but Kinoshita got away from it after Sasaki caught Kinoshita's arm, staring at her, and Kinoshita got "seriously freaked out". Kinoshita later commented on this shortly before her retirement, confirming it and describing Sasaki as something on a different level from a mere brawler, which makes her "gang" past highly questionable.

In August 2010, she landed on the cover of the anan magazine, with a black dress and a body shape slightly reminiscent of her past as a fashion model. At that time she signed a new endorsement contract with FinePix of Fujifilm and attended its ceremonial press conference, with another black dress designed by her former fan Razor Ramon HG and a body shape fairly reminiscent of her past as a fashion model. Some of the fashion press made mention of these appearances. The September number of the Ray magazine headlined "Nozomi» has returned?", and associated the black dresses with some of her past nicknames related to the black color such as "Black Surgeon / Black Maiden". Sankei Shimbun, also featured this appearance, referring to her as "Nozomi".

In November 2010, Akita Prefecture chose her as one of the two official PR-Ambassadors, along with Natsuki Kato, with the purpose of creating a better image of the prefecture. The mayor Norihisa Satake officially commented on the selection that he was hoping that she would eradicate Akita's image being snowy and dark, with her image being fine and cheerful.

Bibliography

Magazines
 Pinky, Shueisha 2004-2009, as an exclusive model from 2006 to 2009
 Non-no, Shueisha 1971-, as a regular model from January 2010 to 2013
 Oggi, Shogakukan 1991-, as a regular model since 2010
 With, Kodansha 1981-, as a regular model since 2013

Photobooks
Nozomi (August 1, 2008 Shueisha) 
Sasaki Nozomi in Tenshi no Koi (October 31, 2009 Kadokawa) 
Non (November 21, 2009 Shueisha) 
Prism (March 30, 2010 Gentosha) 
Nozokimi (July, 2010 Gentosha) 
Non♡non (December 1, 2011 Shueisha) 
 Sasakiki (September 5, 2013 Shueisha) 
 Kakushigoto (September 26, 2016 Kodansha)

Discography

Singles
  feat. Astro (2010 July 21, Sony Music Japan)
  feat. Pentaphonic (2010 November 24, Sony Music Japan)
  (2011 October 26, Sony Music Japan)

Albums
Nozomi Collection (2012 April 18, Sony Music Japan)

DVDs
 Nozomi [DVD] ([IV] Nozomi Sasaki - Weekly Young Jump Premium)
 Dolly [DVD] (Nozomi Sasaki Dolly)
 Nozomi Sasaki Holy Land Bali [DVD]

Filmography

Film roles
 The Handsome Suit (2008), Remi
 Tenshi No Koi (2009), Rio Ozawa
 Afro Tanaka (2012), Aya Kato
 Paikaji Nankai Sakusen (2012), Kimi
 Sango Ranger (2013), Risa Shimabukuro
 Fu-Zoku Changed My Life (2013), Kayo
 Ju-on: Beginning of the End (2014), Yui Ikuno
 The Furthest End Awaits (2015), Eriko Yamazaki
 Ju-on: The Final (2015), Yui Shōno
 Enishi: The Bride of Izumo (2016), Maki Īzuka
 Lost and Found (2016), Nanami Kiyokawa
 Kanon (2016), Akane Kishimoto
 Desperate Sunflowers (2016), Marina Kamiya
 My Korean Teacher (Ikinawa Sensei) (2016), Sakura
 The Last Cop: The Movie (2017), Yui Suzuki
 Tokyo Ghoul (2017), Kaya Irimi
 Rika: Love Obsessed Psycho (2021), Naomi Umemoto
 Red Shoes (2023)

Television roles
 Kami no Shizuku (2009, NTV) as Sara
 Shaken Baby! (2010, Fuji TV) as Sakurako Seo
 Straight Man (2010, Fuji TV and Kansai TV) as Yukie Kayashima
 Dohyo Girl (2010, MBS) as Hikaru Wakabayashi
 Sazae-san 3 (2011, Fuji TV) as the future (fictional) Hanako Hanazawa
 Propose Kyodai (2011, Fuji TV) as Minami Watanabe
 Kaito Royale (2011, TBS) as Sister Snake
 All She Was Worth (2011, TV Asahi) as Kyoko Shinjō
 Koi Nante Zeitaku ga Watashi ni Ochite Kuru no Darouka? (2012, Fuji TV)
 TOKYO Airport: Air Traffic Controller (2012, Fuji TV) as Mana Sakai
 Otenki Onee-san (2013, TV Asahi) as Akane Hashimoto
 Yonimo Kimyō na Monogatari 2013 Haru no Tokubetsuhen (2013, Fuji TV) as Misaki Yoshida
 Umi no Ue no Sinryōjo (2013, Fuji TV) as Aki Shirai
 Koi Suru Eve (2013, NTV) as Nao Nanami
 Hoshi Shinichi Mystery Special Kiri no Hoshi de (2014, Fuji TV)
 First Class (2014, Fuji TV) as Miina
 Cabin Attendant Keiji: New York Satsujin Jiken (2014, Fuji TV) as Haruka Mano
 A Chef of Nobunaga (2014, TV Asahi) as Karen
 Hissatsu Shigotonin 2014 (2014, TV Asahi) as Otū
 Kurofuku Monogatari (2014, TV Asahi) as Kyōko
 Kekkon ni Ichiban Chikakute Tōi Onna(2015, NTV) as Kanna Satō
 Scapegoat (2015, Wowow) as Mayu Misaki
 I'm Home (2015, TV Asahi) as Mari Nishizawa
 The Last Cop (2015, NTV) as Yui Suzuki
 Shizumanu Taiyō (2016, Wowow)
 Fukuyado Honpo: Kyoto Love Story (2016)
 Ame ga Furu to Kimi wa Yasashii (2017, Hulu)
 The Many Faces of Ito (2018, Netflix), Tomomi Shimahara (A)
 The Supporting Actors 3 (2021, TV Tokyo), Herself
 Come Come Everybody (2022, NHK), Nana Sasagawa
 Youtuber ni Musume wa Yaran (2022, TV Tokyo), Taira Chisa

Japanese dub
 Kong: Skull Island (2017), Mason Weaver (voice-over for Brie Larson)

References

External links
 Official profile by Top Coat 
  by Sony Music Japan 
 
 

Japanese female models
Japanese women pop singers
Japanese film actresses
Japanese gravure models
Japanese television actresses
Japanese television personalities
Mixed martial arts broadcasters
Kickboxing commentators
Models from Akita Prefecture
1988 births
Living people
Sony Music Entertainment Japan artists
21st-century Japanese actresses
21st-century Japanese women singers
21st-century Japanese singers